Walter Johnson High School (also known as Walter Johnson or WJ) is a public upper secondary school located in the census-designated place of North Bethesda, Maryland (Bethesda postal address). The school was founded in 1956 and named after Walter Johnson, a famous baseball player who was also a native of Montgomery County, Maryland.  WJHS serves portions of Bethesda, North Bethesda, Potomac, and Rockville, as well as the towns of Garrett Park and Kensington. It is a part of Montgomery County Public Schools (MCPS).

History

The school first opened to grades 10-12 in 1956, and was named after the local baseball pitcher and politician, Walter Johnson. The school's original mascot was the Spartan; it became the Mighty Moo in 1963, named after the cows that roamed the fields before the school was built. After a 1987 consolidation with nearby Charles W. Woodward High School, Walter Johnson maintained its school colors of white and green, but adopted Woodward's mascot, "Wild Thing" the Wildcat.

Notable alumni
 Robb Austin – politician, Pennsylvania House of Representatives, (Class of 1968)
 David John Doukas – physician and medical ethicist
 Anita Dunn – advisor to President Barack Obama (class of 1976)
 Jeremy Ebobisse – professional soccer player for the Portland Timbers (Class of 2014)
 Georgia Engel – actress
 Florent Groberg – Medal of Honor recipient (class of 2001)
 Jonathan Hadary – actor (class of 1966)
 Colleen Haskell – actress and 1st season contestant of reality TV show Survivor (class of 1994)
 Stephen Herek – film director and producer, Broadway producer (class of 1976)
 John Michael Higgins – actor/director (class of 1981)
 Tommy Keene – singer/songwriter (class of 1976)
 Ariana Kelly – politician, Maryland House of Delegates (class of 1994)
 Candace S. Kovacic-Fleischer - law professor (class of 1965)
 John Kronstadt – district judge (class of 1969)
 Tim Kurkjian – ESPN baseball reporter and analyst (class of 1974)
 Roy Lee – film producer (class of 1987)
 Jeffrey S. Lehman – former President of Cornell University, scholar and lawyer (class of 1973)
 Jeffrey C. Hall - Nobel Prize in Medicine recipient, geneticist and chronobiologist (class of 1963)
 Nils Lofgren – rock musician, composed Jhoon Rhee Karate Theme (class of 1969 - did not graduate)
 Rudy Maxa – consumer-travel expert; host/producer of PBS travel shows; Wheel Club officer (class of 1967) 
 Matt McCoy – actor (class of 1974)
 Caroline Miller – professional soccer player (class of 2009)
 Alain Nu – mentalist and magician (class of 1983)
 Jody Olsen – Peace Corps Director (class of 1961)
 Carl Pope – ex-Executive Director of the Sierra Club (class of 1963)
 James Risen – Pulitzer Prize-winning investigative reporter and author (class of 1973)
 Tommy Smith — rugby player for the United States national rugby sevens team, baseball shortstop player (class of 1974)
 Cal Thomas – syndicated columnist and author (class of 1960)
 Brian Transeau – electronic musician and composer (class of 1988)
 David J. Williams – science-fiction and video game author (class of 1989)
 Gedion Zelalem – professional soccer player for New York City FC (entered with class of 2015 - did not graduate)
 Gerald Zerkin – senior assistant federal public defender; defended Zacarias Moussaoui (class of 1967)

References 
27. https://www.texasmonthly.com/articles/stephen-herek

External links 

 

Educational institutions established in 1956
Public high schools in Montgomery County, Maryland
1956 establishments in Maryland
Schools in Bethesda, Maryland
North Bethesda, Maryland